Jacopo (also Iacopo) is a masculine Italian given name, derivant from Latin Iacōbus. It is an Italian variant of Giacomo.

 Jacopo Aconcio, Italian religious reformer
 Jacopo Bassano (1592), Italian painter
 Iacopo Barsotti (1921–1987), Italian mathematician
 Jacopo da Bologna, Italian composer 
 Jacopo Comin (1518–1594), Italian painter otherwise known as Tintoretto
 Jacopo Carucci (1494–1557), Italian painter otherwise known as Pontormo
 Jacopo Corsi (1561–1602), Italian composer
 Jacopo da Leona (died 1277), Italian poet 
 Jacopo Peri (1561–1633), Italian composer
 Jacopo della Quercia (1438), Italian sculptor
 Jacopo Riccati (1676–1754), Italian mathematician
 Jacopo Sadoleto (1477–1547), Italian Catholic cardinal
 Jacopo M. (1989), Italian Communicator, upholder of the European Commission
Fictional characters:
 Jacopo, a key character in the 2002 film version of The Count of Monte Cristo (and a minor character in the book).
 Jacopo Bearzatti, one of the central characters of The House in Fata Morgana and the protagonist of the prequel The House in Fata Morgana: A Requiem for Innocence
 Jacopo Belbo, one of the main characters of Foucault's Pendulum by Umberto Eco
 Jacopo Peterman, a character portrayed by John O'Hurley in the sitcom Seinfeld

See also 
Iacopo
Jack (given name)

Italian masculine given names